Fomka the Fool  is a one-act opera by Anton Rubinstein to a libretto by M. L. Mikhaylov. It was given its only performance in 1853.

Background
Fomka was the second of Rubinstein's operas to be performed. It was commissioned, together with two other one-act operas, The Siberian Hunters and Vengeance, by the Grand Duchess Yelena Pavlovna. The title role was sung by Lev Leonov, the son of the pianist John Field.

The performance appears to have been a disaster. The composer wrote 'It was performed in such a way that I gathered everything up and do not intend to give any more of my works on the Russian stage [...] [The performers] missed out whole bars, came in early, forgot their parts [..]' Rubinstein went to the theatre office the next day and insisted that his score be returned to him. The failure was an incentive for Rubinstein to quit Russia to seek a career in Western Europe. Although Rubinstein offered the opera to Franz Liszt to be performed in Weimar in 1854,
the score now appears to be lost.

Roles

References
Notes

Sources
Rubinstein, Anton, ed. L. I. Barenboym, Autobiograficheskiye Rasskazi (in Russian), St. Peterburg, 2005 
Taylor, Philip S., Anton Rubinstein: a Life in Music, Bloomington and Indianapolis, 2007 

Operas
1853 operas
Russian-language operas
Operas by Anton Rubinstein
Lost operas
One-act operas
Operas set in Russia